Crows is an unincorporated community in Dyer Township, Saline County, Arkansas. It is located in the valley of the Middle Fork Saline River at the intersection of Arkansas highways 5 and 9.

References

Unincorporated communities in Saline County, Arkansas
Unincorporated communities in Arkansas